Lyons is a town in Washington Township, Greene County, Indiana, United States. The population was 742 at the 2010 census. It is part of the Bloomington, Indiana Metropolitan Statistical Area.

History
Lyons was named in honor of Squire Joe Lyons, a county official. The Lyons post office opened in 1870.

Geography
Lyons is located at  (38.988685, -87.082211).

Demographics

2010 census
As of the census of 2010, there were 742 people, 270 households, and 175 families living in the town. The racial makeup of the town was 98.1% White, 0.1% African American, 0.5% Native American, 0.3% Asian, 0.1% from other races, and 0.8% from two or more races. Hispanic or Latino of any race were 1.5% of the population.

There were 270 households, of which 31.5% had children under the age of 18 living with them, 50.0% were married couples living together, 10.7% had a female householder with no husband present, 4.1% had a male householder with no wife present, and 35.2% were non-families. 29.6% of all households were made up of individuals, and 15.2% had someone living alone who was 65 years of age or older. The average household size was 2.53 and the average family size was 3.04.

The median age in the town was 43.3 years. 22.1% of residents were under the age of 18; 7.9% were between the ages of 18 and 24; 21.9% were from 25 to 44; 23.8% were from 45 to 64; and 24.3% were 65 years of age or older. The gender makeup of the town was 49.2% male and 50.8% female.

2000 census

As of the census of 2000, there were 748 people, 281 households, and 198 families living in the town. The racial makeup of the town was 98.93% White, 0.27% Native American, 0.40% Asian, 0.13% from other races, and 0.27% from two or more races. Hispanic or Latino of any race were 0.80% of the population.

There were 281 households, out of which 34.2% had children under the age of 18 living with them, 54.1% were married couples living together, 11.0% had a female householder with no husband present, and 29.2% were non-families. 26.0% of all households were made up of individuals, and 15.3% had someone living alone who was 65 years of age or older. The average household size was 2.48 and the average family size was 2.93.

In the town, the population was spread out, with 26.1% under the age of 18, 7.1% from 18 to 24, 25.0% from 25 to 44, 21.5% from 45 to 64, and 20.3% who were 65 years of age or older. The median age was 38 years. For every 100 females, there were 87.5 males. For every 100 females age 18 and over, there were 79.5 males.

The median income for a household in the town was $25,592, and the median income for a family was $30,139. Males had a median income of $25,909 versus $18,125 for females. The per capita income for the town was $12,771. About 20.1% of families and 20.7% of the population were below the poverty line, including 31.7% of those under age 18 and 15.0% of those age 65 or over.

References

External links
 White River Valley School Corporation
 Greene County Daily World Newspaper
 Greene County Economic Development Corporation

Towns in Greene County, Indiana
Towns in Indiana
Bloomington metropolitan area, Indiana